Viktor von Schwedler (18 January 1885 – 30 October 1954) was a general in the Wehrmacht of Nazi Germany who commanded an army corps and a military district during World War II. He was awarded the Knight's Cross of the Iron Cross.

Schwedler was made commanding general of the IV. Army Corps following the Blomberg-Fritsch Affair of 1938. He was transferred to the Führerreserve in October 1942. On 1 March 1943 he was appointed commanding general of the 4th Military District in Dresden a position he held until 31 January 1945. He was still responsible for the measures after the bombing of Dresden on 13 February and 15 February 1945.

Awards and decorations

 Knight's Cross of the Iron Cross on 29 June 1940 as General der Infanterie and commanding general of the IV. Armeekorps

References

Citations

Bibliography

 

1885 births
1954 deaths
German Army generals of World War II
Generals of Infantry (Wehrmacht)
Recipients of the Knight's Cross of the Iron Cross
Recipients of the clasp to the Iron Cross, 1st class
Major generals of the Reichswehr
Heads of the Army Personnel Office (Wehrmacht)
Military personnel from Rhineland-Palatinate
People from Rhein-Lahn-Kreis